General William Cartwright (28 February 1797 – 5 June 1873) was a British Army officer.

Military career
Born the son of William Ralph Cartwright MP and Emma Mary Maude Cartwright, Cartwright served in the 61st (South Gloucestershire) Regiment of Foot and then in the 3rd Dragoons and then the 10th Hussars. He was present at the Battle of the Pyrenees in July 1813, the Battle of Nivelle in November 1813 and the Battle of the Nive in December 1813 as well as the Battle of Waterloo in June 1815. He was buried at St Michael Churchyard, Aynho, Northamptonshire.

References

British Army generals
1797 births
1873 deaths
61st Regiment of Foot officers